Pacific Trim is the fifth EP released by American indie rock band Pavement on January 23, 1996. It was recorded on short notice to coincide with the band's Australian tour. The recording features only Stephen Malkmus, Bob Nastanovich and Steve West — the session had actually been booked for a Silver Jews recording, but David Berman became unavailable at the last minute and the group couldn't afford to waste the studio time. The CD release contained three tracks with a fourth song, "I Love Perth", included only on the vinyl edition, which references the city of Perth in Western Australia. Allmusic concludes that the EP "isn't much more than a throwaway, but it is an extremely enjoyable one".

Although the EP is out of print, all four songs are available on the two-CD set Wowee Zowee: Sordid Sentinels Edition.

Track listing
"Give It a Day" – 2:37
"Gangsters and Pranksters" – 1:29
"Saganaw" – 3:31
"I Love Perth" – 1:08 (vinyl version only)

References

Pavement (band) albums
1996 EPs